The toad lumpsucker (Eumicrotremus phrynoides) is a species of fish in the family Cyclopteridae that is found in the Bering Sea and Gulf of Alaska, where it occurs at depths of .

References 

Toad lumpsucker
Fish described in 1912
Taxa named by Charles Henry Gilbert